Caladenia ovata, commonly known as the Kangaroo Island spider orchid is a plant in the orchid family Orchidaceae and is endemic to South Australia. It is a ground orchid with a single hairy leaf and one or two red flowers, sometimes with yellow patches. It is only found on Kangaroo Island and nearby Fleurieu Peninsula.

Description
The sepals have fine, club-like glandular tips. The sides of the labellum lack teeth and the tip is rolled under. There are four rows of widely spaced calli along the mid-line of the labellum. Flowering occurs from September to November but rarely occurs except after fire.

Taxonomy and naming
Caladenia ovata  was first formally described in 1909 by Richard Rogers and the description was published in Transactions, proceedings and report, Royal Society of South Australia. The specific epithet (ovata) is a Latin word meaning "egg-shaped".

Distribution and habitat
Kangaroo Island spider orchid occurs on Kangaroo Island and the Fleurieu Peninsula where it grows singly or in small clumps in thick scrub, often in association with Eucalyptus viminalis.

Conservation
Caladenia ovata is classified as "vulnerable" under the Commonwealth Government Environment Protection and Biodiversity Conservation Act 1999 (EPBC) Act and as "Endangered" under the South Australian National Parks and Wildlife Act. The main threats are weed invasion, habitat degradation and unsuitable fire regimes.

References

ovata
Plants described in 1909
Endemic orchids of Australia
Orchids of South Australia